Alien Souls is a lost 1916 silent film feature directed by Frank Reicher and starring Sessue Hayakawa, his real-life wife Tsuru Aoki and Earle Foxe.

Cast
Sessue Hayakawa - Sakata
Tsuru Aoki - Yuri Chan
Earle Foxe - Aleck Lindsay
Grace Benham - Mrs. Conway
J. Parks Jones - Jack Holloway
Violet Malone - Gertrude Van Ness
Dorothy Abril - Geraldine Smythe

References

External links
 Alien Souls at IMDb.com
allmovie/synopsis; Alien Souls

1916 films
American silent feature films
Paramount Pictures films
Films based on short fiction
Films directed by Frank Reicher
1916 drama films
Silent American drama films
American black-and-white films
Lost American films
Lost drama films
1916 lost films
1910s American films